The 1948–49 Challenge Cup was the 48th staging of rugby league's oldest knockout competition, the Challenge Cup.

The 29 clubs of the rugby league were joined in the competition by three junior clubs, one each from Yorkshire, Lancashire and Cumberland; respectively these junior clubs were Normanton, Vine Tavern and Broughton Moor.

First round
The first round ties were two-legged and were to be played on consecutive weekends in February 1949.  The draw was made on 17 January 1949.  The tie between Vine Tavern and York was drawn to have the leg at York played first but the clubs agreed to reverse the tie to enable Vine Tavern to play their home leg Knowsley Road, home of nearby St. Helens. Featherstone's tie with Swinton should have had the first leg played at Featherstone.  However Featherstone invoked their right under the competition rules as the first drawn club to decide where the first leg would be played and insisted that it was played at Swinton to avoid clashes with the home ties of neighbouring clubs, Normanton and Castleford, this was despite Swinton's opposition to the switch.

The first leg ties were played on Saturday 12 February.

The second leg ties were played on Saturday 19 February.

The tie between Leigh and Wigan ended in controversy.  In January the cup committee recommended that ties ending with the scores level should play 20 minutes of extra time (10 minutes each way) with a replay only being required if the scores remained tied after this period.  This recommendation as accepted by the Rugby League Council but was not, officially, made known to referees.  Therefore, at the end of the second leg the referee in the Leigh v Wigan tie, Alfred Hill, ended the game after 80 minutes and did not play any extra time.  The second leg was declared null and void by the Rugby League Council and a replay ordered for the following Saturday at a neutral venue, Swinton's Station Road with only the score from the first leg being taken forward into the replay.

The replay, refereed by W. Hemmings, was won 10–4 by Wigan who therefore went forward to the second round 21–16 on aggregate.

Second round
The second round draw was made on 21 February 1949 with ties to be played on Saturday 5 March.  On the day the game between Wigan and Wakefield was postponed due to snowfall and was played the following Wednesday, 9 March, instead.

Third round
The draw for the third round was made on 7 March with ties to be played on Saturday 19 March.

Semi-finals
The semi-final draw was made on 21 March with neutral venues being announced immediately after the completion of the draw, the ties were played on 2 April.

Final
The Challenge Cup tournament's final was to be played by Bradford and Halifax at Wembley Stadium. Bradford won the game 12–0 in the final played in front of a world record rugby league crowd of 95,000. Trevor Foster and Eric Batten scored the tries for Bradford and Ernest Ward kicked three goals as well as winning the Lance Todd Trophy for man-of-the-match.

This was Bradford's fourth Cup Final win in seven final appearances including one win and one loss during World War II.

References

Challenge Cup
Challenge Cup